Love Island (originally Celebrity Love Island) was a British reality television programme that was aired on ITV in 2005 and 2006. In the show, twelve single celebrities spend five weeks on an island in Fiji. The final couple remaining wins a combined £100,000.

History
It was originally presented by Patrick Kielty and Kelly Brook, with Fearne Cotton taking over as female host in the second series. The first series aired in the summer of 2005, and it was won by Jayne Middlemiss and Fran Cosgrave. The second series began in July 2006, dropping Celebrity from its name. It was won by Bianca Gascoigne and series one finalist Calum Best.

The theme tune for the first series was "Wish I", performed by Jem. A specially-composed summer theme by Daniel Pemberton (later released under the title "From Fiji with Love") was used for the second series.

Cancellation
Following disappointing ratings over the two spring-summer periods, the show was axed by ITV's director of television, Simon Shaps, in November 2006.

Revival series

On 13 February 2015, it was announced that the show would return on ITV2 in 2015 simply called Love Island. ITV's Director of Digital and Acquisitions Angela Jain confirmed the revived show would be revamped and would see non-celebrity contestants compete to survive a public vote each week.

It was later announced that Caroline Flack would host the reboot, starting on 7 June 2015. The reboot has been a ratings success for ITV2 and the show's format has spawned into an international franchise of the same name.

Format
Viewers would vote for the couple they would like to see in the "love shack" where the two would get to know one another better. In the first series, each week viewers voted celebrities off the island, but in the second, the inhabitants had the final say. The identities of those being kicked out were revealed in the elimination episodes. The prize for the final couple left standing was £50,000 each. The second series also featured the inhabitants having to cook and clean up after themselves to fight the appearance that they were just there for a free holiday.

Series overview

Series 1 (2005)
The first series was broadcast during the summer of 2005.

The show attracted controversy from the moment it was announced by ITV. It was marketed as a rival for Channel 4's popular reality show, Big Brother, which returned for a sixth series soon after the show's launch. Following the launch of the show, the celebrities were criticised by viewers for being boring, and the celebrity status of some of the participants was questioned. There was some suspicion that the contestants were simply using the programme as a free holiday, and the tabloids claimed that producers held crisis meetings to figure out how to keep things interesting.

Soon afterwards, tabloid reports claimed that the show's presenters, Kelly Brook and Patrick Kielty, were engaged in a bitter feud. The problems between the pair allegedly started after Kielty told viewers on the live show that Brook had previously been involved in a relationship with one of the contestants, Paul Danan. However, even the promise of fireworks between the two hosts was not enough to keep viewers interested, and one episode of the show only attracted less than 2 million viewers. Producers later hired model Nikki Ziering to spice up the show.

The show was also resented by fans of long-running ITV soap Coronation Street. ITV decided to move its flagship programme from 19:30 to 20:30 on Monday nights, to provide a successful lead-in for Celebrity Love Island, in the hope of increasing ratings. Writers John Fay and Daran Little complained to the press about the treatment of the show. ITV argued that it took the decision to move the soap very seriously and only did so when absolutely necessary. A meeting was requested with ITV programming director Nigel Pickard to discuss the issue.

On 10 June 2005, although ratings were beginning to pick up, with the show close to overtaking Big Brother in popularity, a strong storm over the islands of Fiji disrupted the programme. A live eviction show had to be cancelled as six-foot waves made it impossible for crewmembers to cross over to where the celebrities were staying. Instead, ITV was forced to repeat the episode from the previous night with unseen footage.

Shekoni was the first celebrity to be voted off the show by the public. "For the short period I was there I got on with everybody and didn't have any negative experiences. But when I watch it now I just think, oh God, I had a lucky escape that I didn't end up crying in front of the cameras, or getting rejected by any of the guys, or involved in any of the arguments. I know my family are just pleased that I got out and didn't do anything to ruin my integrity and morals and didn't do anything embarrassing in there. I knew almost instantly that I didn't fancy any of them, and I think that's why I got voted out. That's fair enough because it is supposed to be the love island and I obviously hadn't found love. I'm still looking, though, and I've been out searching ever since."

Series 2 (2006)
The second and final series first aired on 10 July, and ran for seven weeks, a little longer than the previous year's series. It was announced in late May 2006 that Fearne Cotton would be Kielty's new co-host with Series 1 winner Jayne Middlemiss presenting Aftersun with Matt Brown on ITV2. It also has a new sponsor, popular chocolate bar Bounty.

On 6 July the list of contestants was announced, with the news that the word "Celebrity" would be dropped from the show title, due to the inclusion of non-celebrities.

10 July–28 August, seven weeks, 17 contestants and 3 house guests:

{| class="wikitable" style="text-align:center;"
|-
! width="150"|Contestant
! width="160"|Known for
! width="150"|Status
|-
|style="background:lavender;"|Bianca Gascoigne
|style="background:lavender;"|Model
|style=background:gold|Winner
|-
|style="background:lavender;"|Calum Best(late arrival week 4)
|style="background:lavender;"|Model
|style=background:gold|Winner
|-
|Kéllé Bryan
|Former Eternal singer
|style=background:silver;|Runner-up
|-
|Brendan Cole
|Strictly Come Dancing professional
|style=background:silver;|Runner-up
|-
|Kate Lawler
|Television & radio broadcaster
|style=background:#f4c7b8|Evicted: At the Final  (late arrival week 6)
|-
|Chris Brosnan
|Film director & writer
|style=background:#f4c7b8|Evicted: Final Day
|-
|Sophie Anderton
|Glamour model
|style=background:#f4c7b8|Evicted: Week 7
|-
|Lee Otway
|Hollyoaks actor
|style=background:#f4c7b8|Evicted: Week 7
|-
|Colleen Shannon
|Playboy model & DJ
|style=background:#f4c7b8|Evicted: Week 7
|-
|Shane Lynch
|Former Boyzone singer
|style="background:plum;"|Walked: Week 5
|-
|Paul Danan
|Former Hollyoaks actor
|style=background:#f4c7b8|Evicted: Week 5 (late arrival day 6)
|-
|Emma and Eve Ryan
|Glamour model
|style=background:#FFE08B|Ejected: Week 4 (late arrivals week 4; ejected after 5 days in the resort)
|-
|Leo Ihenacho
|Singer & actor
|style=background:#f4c7b8|Evicted: Week 4
|-
|Emily Scott
|Swimwear model
|style=background:#f4c7b8|Evicted: Week 3 (late arrival week 3)|-
|Lady Victoria Hervey
|Model & socialite
|style=background:#f4c7b8|Evicted: Week 2
|-
|Alicia Douvall
|Glamour model
|style=background:#f4c7b8|Evicted: Week 1
|}

House guests 
On Love Island, three house guests entered the resort for set periods of time, which was usually a contract of a week. House guests were not eligible for evictions or winning the prize fund of £50,000 at the end of the series, but were allowed to be voted into the Love Shack. As with the actual contestants they received an appearance salary.

Returns
 In week two, in a bid to boost the ratings, the producers decided series one contestant Paul Danan would be put on Love Island as a regular contestant hoping he would provide the rating winning actions of the previous year. Danan was known by most on the island especially Lee Otway and Lady Victoria Hervey whose sister Isabella was involved with him in the first series and for a short period afterwards.
 On 7 August series one finalist Calum Best entered Love Island for the second time, where he attracted a lot of female attention, especially from Bianca Gascoigne, with whom he struck up a romance.
 After Sophie Anderton and Chris Brosnan were seen getting closer, evicted Lady Victoria Hervey returned to the Island for a day and hid in the secret suite where she confronted her friend Sophie and poured a bottle of wine over her head for moving in on her man.
 On 20 August Leo Ihenacho made a surprise return by jumping out of a pop out cake, to the resort for one night only to confront Calum and Bianca over their relationship. He left the next day.

Notes
On 18 July, Steve-O was added to the show in an effort to boost ratings. Despite stating that he had stopped drinking, he asked for beer while on the show. On 19 July, he abruptly left Love Island because he was not allowed enough alcohol or chocolate.

Lady Victoria Hervey was voted off the show on Friday 21 July although her chosen man Chris Brosnan had been the favourite to leave. Hervey told hosts Patrick Kielty and Fearne Cotton that she hoped the relationship would continue in the real world but then had second thoughts when she was shown footage of Brosnan saying that he also liked Colleen.

Basketball legend Dennis Rodman entered the show on the third week on 27 July as a House guest to boost the ratings. He flirted with Colleen Shannon and created friction with Lee Otway (who was coupled with Shannon at the time) before walking on his fourth day on 30 July out of the seven contracted until 3 August 2006. Otway fell in love with Shannon but when she revealed that she only saw him as a friend, Otway caused thousands of pounds damage to villa equipment in a fit of anger. He later apologised but was subsequently evicted on the seventh week.

Identical twins Emma and Eve Ryan joined the Love Island on 31 July, but were ejected from the show by producers on 4 August. No explanation was given to the public.

It was announced on 6 August that Calum Best would enter Love Island next day. Also on 6 August, it was confirmed on the Love Island website that Shane Lynch had left the island to make up with a woman back home.

On 14 August, Big Brother 3 winner Kate Lawler entered Celebrity Love Island. On final night, 28 August 2006, Kate Lawler was the last girl to be evicted before the final showdown.

The winners were Bianca Gascoigne and Calum Best, with Kéllé Bryan and Brendan Cole runners-up.

An average of 3.8 million people tuned in to watch the final, peaking at 4.4m, down from the previous year's peak figure of 5.9 million.

Big Brother competition
The show did not always go head to head with Channel 4's Big Brother, as Big Brother aired at 9pm on Tuesdays, Saturdays and Sundays and only clashed on Mondays, Wednesdays, Thursdays and Fridays with Celebrity Love Island at 10pm. However, many terrestrial viewers in Wales could only watch Big Brother at a fixed 10.00pm slot every night on S4C which also broadcast the show due to many Welsh terrestrial televisions failing to receive Channel 4. Celebrity Love Island's audience was about half the size of that for Big Brother.

Reception
In a negative review of the first series for The Guardian, Charlie Brooker writes that the show is "just a rehash of I'm A Celebrity, minus the elements that made that show successful". Brooker criticises that the show "openly sneers" at Abi Titmuss' weight, calls Paul Danan a "bell end of considerable magnitude", jokes that the Fran Cosgrave is so little well known that "he doesn't actually exist outside shows like this" and insults the presenting of Patrick Kielty and Kelly Brook, described respectively as "a man you wish would shut up before he even starts speaking, and a woman who can scarcely talk in the first place".

See also
 Temptation Island Paradise Hotel Forever Eden Love in the Wild''

References

External links
 
 

2000s British reality television series
2005 British television series debuts
2006 British television series endings
British dating and relationship reality television series
Celebrity reality television series
ITV reality television shows
Television shows set in Fiji
Love Island (franchise)
Television series by ITV Studios